Poetry is a town in Kaufman and Hunt counties, Texas, United States. It is located at the intersection of Farm to Market Roads 986 and 1565, approximately six miles north of Terrell.  The population, as of 2020, is estimated to be 2,069.

Originally known as Turner's Point, a post office and school were established in 1858. In 1876, the community was renamed Poetry. The new name was suggested by local merchant Maston Ussery, who said that the area in springtime reminded him of a poem. Poetry's population peaked at around 234 in 1904. Its post office closed in 1905 and service was consolidated within nearby Terrell. A 1984 incorporation vote was approved by local residents, but was invalidated by the Kaufman County Commissioners Court due to technicalities. Today, Poetry is a widely dispersed, lightly populated community.

Public education in the community of Poetry is provided by the Terrell Independent School District .

In the 2020 Election, the residents of Poetry again voted to incorporate.

In 2023 the Town of Poetry released research performed by their attorneys that shows that several hundred residents were wrongfully excluded from the incorporation election.  Unfortunately, any election challenge is required to be filed within 30 days so the residents of Poetry are stuck with the results of an election that might not have followed the "statutory process".

References

External links
Town of Poetry - Official site.

Towns in Texas
Towns in Kaufman County, Texas
Dallas–Fort Worth metroplex
Populated places established in 1858
1858 establishments in Texas